Roy Richard Grinker Sr. (August 2, 1900 – May 9, 1993) was an American neurologist and psychiatrist,  Professor of Psychiatry at University of Chicago, and pioneer in American psychiatry and psychosomatics.

Biography 
Grinker was born in Chicago, where his father was a neuropsychiatrist. He received a B.S. from the University of Chicago in 1919 and a M.D. in 1921 from Rush Medical College. Directly afterwards he spent a postgraduate year in Europe. In 1933 back in Europe he took psychoanalytic training with Sigmund Freud.

In 1927 Grinker started teaching at the University of Chicago. In World War II he served at the U.S. Army Medical Corps in North Africa, where with John P. Spiegel he wrote the book Men Under Stress. Back in Chicago in 1946 Grinker started at the Michael Reese Hospital as director of the Institute for Psychosomatic and Psychiatric Research and Training. and as analyst at the Chicago Institute for Psychoanalysis. From 1951 to 1969 he was clinical professor of psychiatry at the University of Illinois College of Medicine, and professor at Northwestern University. In 1969 became professor of psychiatry at the University of Chicago School of Medicine. Grinker was the chief editor of the American Medical Association's Archives of General Psychiatry for 17 years.

Grinker was the father of Roy R. Grinker Jr. and grandfather of Roy Richard Grinker (born 1961), Professor of Anthropology, International Affairs, and Human Sciences at The George Washington University. The neuropathological phenomenon Grinker myelinopathy is named after Grinker.

Selected publications
 1933. Grinker's Neurology
 1946. Men under stress. with John P. Spiegel, Philadelphia: Blakiston. 1945.
 1945. War Neuroses. with John P. Spiegel, Philadelphia: Blakiston, 1945.
 1953. Psychosomatic Research.  New York: Norton
 1955. Anxiety and stress. With H. Basowitz, H. Persky, and S.J. Korchin
 1961. The phenomena of depressions. With J. Miller, M. Sabshin, R. Nunn, and J.C. Nunnally
 1967. Toward a Unified Theory of Human Behavior: An Introduction to General Systems Theory, with Helen MacGill Hughes, 390 pp.
 1968. The borderline syndrome: A behavioral study of ego-functions With B. Werble & R.C. Drye

References

External links 

 Memorial for Roy R. Grinker Sr.
 Roy R. Grinker Sr., M.D. (1900–1993)

1900 births
1990 deaths
American neurologists
American psychiatrists
American systems scientists
University of Chicago faculty
Analysands of Sigmund Freud
Analysands of Franz Alexander
20th-century American physicians
Scientists from Chicago
Physicians from Illinois